The Laurel District is a diverse residential and commercial neighborhood in Oakland, California. encompassing the blocks northeast of Interstate 580 between High Street and 35th Avenue.  It lies at an elevation of 226 feet (69 m), and is bordered by the Allendale neighborhood to the west, the Redwood Heights neighborhood to the east, the Dimond District to the north, and the Maxwell Park neighborhood to the south. At the heart of the neighborhood lies MacArthur Blvd., a bustling shopping area with annual festivals and many local shops.

History

The Laurel district traces its name to the Laurel Grove Park residential tract, which was laid out in 1900 at the north end of the district's contemporary boundaries. Originally named Key Route Heights after the Key Route streetcar system, the neighborhood adopted the Laurel name after the city of Oakland built Laurel Elementary School in 1910.

The prominent Laurel Gateway Arches over MacArthur Blvd at either end of the district were designed and installed in 2006.

MacArthur Blvd., which runs through the Laurel district, was once U.S. Highway 50, before Interstate 580 was built to replace it in the early 1960s.  Two movie houses in Laurel were in operation from the 1920s until the 1960s.  The Laurel Theater is now a church. The Hopkins Cinema at 3525 MacArthur now houses a Goodwill  thrift store and an AutoZone auto parts store. Earlier (around the 1950s) it was a Hagstroms supermarket.

Education
The Oakland Unified School District operates district public schools. Laurel Elementary School is located in Laurel. Residents are also zoned to Bret Harte Middle School and Skyline High School.

At the southeast end of the Laurel neighborhood lies the John Swett School site, now home to The Urban Montessori Charter School. John Swett School, which closed in 2004, is notable as the elementary school alma mater of actor Tom Hanks.

See also

Dimond District, Oakland
Maxwell Park, Oakland
Redwood Heights, Oakland

References

External links
Laurel District Association - Neighborhood Association for residents and merchants
Laurel Village Association - Volunteer Neighbors Association for Laurel Residents

Neighborhoods in Oakland, California
Streetcar suburbs